Trissexodon is a monotypic genus of air-breathing land snails, terrestrial pulmonate gastropod mollusks in the subfamily Trissexodontinae of the family Trissexodontidae.

Species
 Trissexodon is the type genus of the family Trissexodontidae, its only species being Trissexodon constrictus (Boubée, 1836).
Synonyms
 † Trissexodon plioauriculatus (Sacco, 1889): synonym of † Protodrepanostoma plioauriculatum (Sacco, 1889) 
Taxon inquirendum
 †  Trissexodon subconstrictus (Souverbie, 1873)

Distribution 
The distribution of the genus Trissexodon includes the western Pyrenees.

References 

 Bank, R. A. (2017). Classification of the Recent terrestrial Gastropoda of the World. Last update: July 16th, 2017

External links
 Pilsbry, H. A. (1893-1895). Manual of conchology, structural and systematic, with illustrations of the species. Ser. 2, Pulmonata. Vol. 9: Helicidae, Vol. 7, Guide to the study of Helices. pp 1-225, pls 1-61. Philadelphia, published by the Conchological Section, Academy of Natural Sciences.

Trissexodontidae
Taxonomy articles created by Polbot